The Reformists Coalition was the main electoral alliance of reformists for the 2013 municipal election of Tehran.

Most reformist figures were disqualified for the elections, including the incumbent councillor Masoumeh Ebtekar, Mohsen Hashemi Rafsanjani and Mahmoud Alizadeh-Tabatabaei among others. Some were dropped off the list, most notably the former councillor Ebrahim Asgharzadeh, who as a result compiled his own list.

The Reformists Coalition was able to win 13 out of 31 seats.

Candidates

References 

Electoral lists for Iranian elections
Reformist political groups in Iran